Glad may refer to:

Glad (Norse mythology), a horse ridden by the gods in Norse mythology

People 
Emil Glad (1929–2009), Croatian actor
Ingrid Kristine Glad (born 1965), Norwegian statistician
John Glad (1941–2015), an American academic, professor of Russian studies
Justen Glad (born 1997), American soccer player
Karl Glad (born 1937), Norwegian jurist and industrialist
Thoralf Glad (1878–1969), Norwegian sailor who competed in the 1912 Summer Olympics
Glad (duke), ruler in the territory of Banat, who was defeated by the Magyars during the 10th century

Organizations 
Glad (company), an American brand of household plastic bags, wrap, and containers
GLAD, Gay & Lesbian Advocates & Defenders, a non-profit legal rights organization
GLAAD, the Gay and Lesbian Alliance Against Defamation

Music 
Glad (band), American Christian pop/rock and a cappella band founded in 1972
G.L.A.D, a song by the English singer Kim Appleby
"Glad", a song by English rock band Traffic from their 1970 album John Barleycorn Must Die
Glad, a 1988 alternative rock album by Miracle Legion

See also
The Gladstone Arms, London, England, known as "The Glad"
"I'm Glad", a song by Jennifer Lopez
I was glad, introit commonly used in the Anglican church